Phallaria ophiusaria, the large leaf moth, is the only species in the monotypic moth genus Phallaria in the family Geometridae. It is known from the Australian states of New South Wales, Queensland and Victoria. Both the genus and species were first described by Achille Guenée in 1857.

The wingspan is about 70 mm. Adult have brown wings with a comma-shaped spot and a diagonal stripe on each wing.

The larvae feed on Acacia pycnantha, Dodonaea species and Hakea rostrata. They are brown with a hairy pointed knob on the tail. It has the habit of standing straight at an angle on a branch, thus resembling a twig.

References

Oenochrominae